Kinoshita Abyell Kanagawa (木下アビエル神奈川) is a Japanese women's professional table tennis club based in Kanagawa Prefecture and playing in the T.League.

Season-by-season records

Current roster
Head coach: Rui Nakazawa

Notable former players
 Yuan Xuejiao (2018–19)

References

External links
 

 
2018 establishments in Japan
Sports teams in Kanagawa Prefecture